Bəylik is a village in the municipality of Qulbəndə in the Agdash Rayon of Azerbaijan.

References

Populated places in Agdash District